Associazione Sportiva Roma continued to trundle in the bigger clubs' wake, being unable to challenge for any trophies, and once again missing out on European football. New president Franco Sensi had won the battle to get the vacancy against Luciano Gaucci, who departed the club in a customary fit of rage. Sensi appointed Carlo Mazzone as coach, but the defensive-minded Mazzone did not have an easy baptism at Roma, the squad drawing 15 out of 34 matches in the league, which rendered missing out on Napoli's sixth place that guaranteed the UEFA Cup by a solitary point.

Players

Goalkeepers
  Fabrizio Lorieri
  Giovanni Cervone
  Andrea Pazzagli

Defenders
  Aldair
  Silvano Benedetti
  Andrea Borsa
  Amedeo Carboni
  Antonio Comi
  Gianluca Festa
  Luigi Garzya
  Gabriele Grossi
  Marco Lanna

Midfielders
  Daniele Berretta
  Walter Bonacina
  Giuseppe Giannini
  Thomas Häßler
  Siniša Mihajlović
  Giovanni Piacentini
  Alessio Scarchilli
  Marco Caputi
  Massimiliano Cappioli

Forwards
  Abel Balbo
  Claudio Caniggia
  Roberto Muzzi
  Ruggiero Rizzitelli
  Francesco Totti
  Walter Lapini

Transfers

Winter

Competitions

Overall

Last updated: 1 May 1994

Serie A

League table

Results summary

Results by round

Matches

Coppa Italia

Second round

Round of 16

Other tournaments

Carlos Menem Trophy

Statistics

Players statistics

Goalscorers
  Abel Balbo 12 (1)
  Ruggiero Rizzitelli 4
  Massimiliano Cappioli 4

References

A.S. Roma seasons
Roma